Taghdir is a studio album by Shadmehr Aghili released in 2009 by Century Records.
All songwriter and Producer by Shadmehr Aghili

Track list

Notes 
 Taghdir song had Twenty Place on the selection of Manoto 1 TV Station Ranking
 Mashkook, Residi, Ye kari kon and Sabab in the Title of Unofficial album(Sabab) was released, Then republished on this title Officially

Sources 
 Shadmehr Aghili Website

2009 albums
Shadmehr Aghili albums